The Czechoslovak Rugby Union was the governing body for rugby in Czechoslovakia. It was responsible for the national leagues as well as the national teams.

History
The Union was founded as the Czechoslovak Rugby Football Association in 1928 with Antonín Trlica as the first president and 160 registered players. Famous Czech writer and illustrator Ondřej Sekora was the second president of the association. In 1990 the name changed to the Czechoslovak Rugby Union with Miloš Dobrý as the last president before the split of Czechoslovakia.

See also
Rugby union in the Czech Republic
Czech Rugby Union
Czechoslovakia national rugby union team

References

Rugby union in Czechoslovakia
Defunct rugby union governing bodies